Garry Mills (also Gary Mills) (born 13 October 1941 in West Wickham, Kent, England) is a former British pop singer.

Mills had three hits on the UK Singles Chart in the early 1960s. Released on Top Rank Records in 1960, these were "Look for a Star" (charted at No 7) and "Top Teen Baby" (No. 24). "I'll Step Down", released on Decca in 1961, charted at No. 39. In the United States, "Look for a Star" reached No. 26 on the Billboard Hot 100.

"Look for a Star" also made the Hot 100 in versions by Deane Hawley, Billy Vaughn and Garry Miles, the latter a pseudonym for Buzz Cason. The song, composed by Tony Hatch, appeared in the soundtrack to the horror film, Circus of Horrors (1960).

References

External links
Gary Mills photograph @ Caroline.rockers.co.uk

British pop singers
British male singers
Imperial Records artists
Living people
Top Rank Records artists
Decca Records artists
1941 births